Thomas Whitgrave (or Whitgreave) (fl. 1650s) was the member of parliament for Staffordshire for the First, Second and Third Protectorate parliaments who was knighted by the Lord Protector Oliver Cromwell in 1658.  He was also considered as a potential recipient  Knight of the Royal Oak, a reward to those Englishmen who faithfully & actively supported Charles II during his exile in France. (The knighthoods conferred by the Lord Protector were not recognised after the Restoration.)

Aiding escape of King Charles II 
After the defeat at the Battle of Worcester on 3 September 1651, Charles II was conducted by Colonel Gifford to Whiteladies Priory on Gifford's Boscobel estate. At Whiteladies, the King was sheltered by the five Penderell brothers who lived there. John Penderell happened to meet Father Huddleston, who suggested that the King should go to Moseley Old Hall on the night of 7 September. He was welcomed by Thomas Whitgrave (Whitgreave), the owner of the house, Alice Whitgreave, Thomas's mother, and John Huddleston, the Catholic priest of the house.  They gave Charles dry clothes, food, and a proper bed (his first since Worcester on 3 September). To guard against surprise, Huddleston was constantly in attendance on the king; his three pupils were stationed as sentinels at upper windows and Thomas Whitgreave patrolled the garden.  On 9 September, Parliamentary troops questioned Whitgreave while the King and Huddleston were hiding in the priest hole. The troops were persuaded that Whitgreave had not fought at Worcester (though he had fought and been captured at the Battle of Naseby in 1645). The troops left without searching the house.

Notes

References
 
 
 
 More detail and a portrait

English MPs 1654–1655
English MPs 1656–1658
English MPs 1659
Year of birth unknown
Year of death unknown